Dayán Viciedo Pérez (born March 10, 1989) is a Cuban professional baseball infielder for the Chunichi Dragons of Nippon Professional Baseball (NPB). He has played in Major League Baseball (MLB) for the Chicago White Sox.

Early life
Viciedo entered Cuba's National Series at age 15 for Villa Clara, and was often compared to Cuban legend Omar Linares, his idol.

Viciedo struggled in his first season in the national series, hitting only .243 through the season's first 50 games. However, in his second season, at age sixteen, he hit .337 with 14 home runs. Viciedo was selected to Cuba's provisional 60-player roster for the 2006 World Baseball Classic, but was not included in the final team.
On May 20, 2008, Viciedo defected from Cuba with his family on a boat bound for Mexico. Once in Mexico he crossed the border to the United States and went to Miami where he was reunited with some of his family. He was approved as a declared free agent by Major League Baseball on November 10, 2008.

Professional career
Viciedo agreed to a four-year, $10 million contract with the Chicago White Sox on December 12, 2008. The contract included a $4 million signing bonus, and paid $1 million in 2009, $1.25 million in 2010 and 2011, as well as $2.5 million in 2012. Signing with the White Sox reunited him with fellow Cuban countryman, Alexei Ramírez.

Minor leagues
Viciedo began the  season with the Double-A Birmingham Barons of the Southern League. During the season, he hit .280 with 12 home runs and 78 RBIs.

Viciedo was batting .290, with 14 home runs and 34 RBI in 238 at bats with Triple-A Charlotte Knights before getting called up by the Chicago White Sox on June 17, 2010. He finished the season batting .274 with 20 home runs and 47 RBI in 343 at-bats.

Viciedo moved to right field at the beginning of the 2011 season in an attempt to get him up to the Major League level faster. He was batting .296, with 20 home runs and 78 RBI in 452 at bats with Triple-A Charlotte Knights before being called up by the White Sox on August 26, 2011 because of an injury to Carlos Quentin.

Chicago White Sox
Viciedo joined the White Sox for their 2009 Spring Training, but did not make the starting roster and was sent to Double-A Birmingham Barons to open the 2009 season. He was invited to Spring Training again in 2010. On June 17, 2010, it was announced that Viciedo would be called up. In his first Major League game against the Washington Nationals he recorded his first hit en route to a White Sox 6–3 win. Viciedo recorded his first Major League home run on July 5, 2010 against Scott Kazmir of the Los Angeles Angels of Anaheim, and two days later, on July 7, recorded his first career double against Joe Saunders of the Los Angeles Angels of Anaheim. In 2010, he played in 38 games and batted .308 with 5 home runs and 13 RBI. In 2011, Viciedo appeared in 29 games and hit .255 with 1 home run and 6 RBI. He would take on a starting role in 2012, and hit career-highs with games played (147), home runs (25), and RBI (78) while recording a .255 batting average.

In 2013, Viciedo suffered an oblique strain in April that required a stint on the 15-day disabled list. In 124 games he would hit .265 with 14 home runs and 56 RBI. 2014 would see Viciedo play in 145 games, batting a career-low .231 with 21 home runs and 58 RBI. He signed a one-year contract worth $4.4 million with the White Sox on January 12, 2015, to avoid arbitration. However, he was designated for assignment on January 28, and released on February 4.

Toronto Blue Jays
On March 1, 2015, Viciedo signed a minor league contract with the Toronto Blue Jays. He would have earned $2.5 million if he made the 25-man roster, however he requested and was granted his release on March 31.

Oakland Athletics
On June 12, 2015, Viciedo signed a minor league contract with the Oakland Athletics. He was released on July 30 after hitting just .221 in 113 at bats for the Athletics AAA club, the Nashville Sounds.

Second stint with the White Sox
On August 1, 2015, Viciedo signed a minor league deal to return to the White Sox.

Chunichi Dragons
On December 1, 2015, Viciedo signed a one-year, $1.4 million contract with the Chunichi Dragons. Viciedo started his Japanese career hitting a Japanese record for a foreign player, with three home runs in the first three opening games against the Hanshin Tigers at the Kyocera Dome. Viciedo was selected for Central League in the 2016 NPB All Star Game as back-up at first base.

In the 2018 NPB season, Viciedo slashed .348/.419/.555 with 26 homers to claim the batting average and hits title leading to selection in the Central League Best 9. On 12 December 2018, it was announced Viciedo had signed  a new 3-year deal with the Dragons with a total value of ¥1.1 billion ($9.9 million).

On August 27, 2021, Viciedo reached 450 RBI in NPB, giving him the most RBI for a non-Japanese player in Chunichi Dragons history. On September 26, Viciedo collected his 765th hit for the Dragons, passing Alonzo Powell for the most hits by a non-Japanese player in club history. On December 1, Viciedo agreed to a three-year contract extension with the Dragons.

See also
List of baseball players who defected from Cuba

References

External links

 
 NPB.jp

1989 births
Living people
American expatriate baseball players in Japan
Birmingham Barons players
Charlotte Knights players
Chicago White Sox players
Chunichi Dragons players
Defecting Cuban baseball players
Cuban emigrants to the United States
Major League Baseball players from Cuba
Cuban expatriate baseball players in the United States
Major League Baseball third basemen
Nashville Sounds players
Naranjas de Villa Clara players
Nippon Professional Baseball infielders
People from Remedios, Cuba
Peoria Javelinas players